Qatar competed at the 2020 Summer Paralympics in Tokyo, Japan, from 24 August to 5 September 2021.

Medalists

Athletics 

One Qatari male athlete, Abdulrahman Abdulqadir Fiqi (Shot Put F34), successfully to break through the qualifications for the 2020 Paralympics after breaking the qualification limit.

References 

2020
Nations at the 2020 Summer Paralympics
2021 in Qatari sport